The 1907–08 IAAUS men's basketball season began in December 1907, progressed through the regular season, and concluded in March 1908.

Season headlines 

 The Missouri Valley Intercollegiate Athletic Association began play, with six original members for basketball. 
 Wabash (24–0) went undefeated during the season.
 After the end of the season, the Eastern Intercollegiate Basketball League (EIBL) began a two-season hiatus, during which its teams played as independents. After a reorganization, the EIBL resumed competition in the 1910–11 season.
 In February 1943, the Helms Athletic Foundation retroactively selected Chicago as its national champion for the 1907–08 season.
 In 1995, the Premo-Porretta Power Poll retroactively selected Wabash as its national champion for the 1907–08 season.

Conference membership changes

Regular season

Conference winners

Statistical leaders

Awards

Helms College Basketball All-Americans 

The practice of selecting a Consensus All-American Team did not begin until the 1928–29 season. The Helms Athletic Foundation later retroactively selected a list of All-Americans for the 1907–08 season.

Major player of the year awards 

 Helms Player of the Year: Charles Keinath, Penn (retroactive selection in 1944)

Coaching changes

References